Governor Brough may refer to:

Charles Hillman Brough (1876–1935), 25th Governor of Arkansas
John Brough (1811–1865), 26th Governor of Ohio